Reemtsma Cigarettenfabriken GmbH is one of the biggest tobacco and cigarette manufacturing companies in Europe and a subsidiary of Imperial Brands. The company's headquarters is in Hamburg, Germany.

History 
Reemtsma was created in 1910 in Erfurt, Germany. In 1918, the production was automated. In the twenties, many German cigarette firms went bankrupt, and the market was increasingly dominated by a few large, highly automated manufacturers, such as what Reemtsma became.

By 1920, Reemtsma had attracted the talents of tobacco expert David Schnur, who became a shareholder and oversaw blending and sourcing.

In 1921, the trade mark "R6" was introduced in the market by Hans Domizlaff. In 1923, production was moved to Altona, now part of the city of Hamburg, where Reemtsma's main headquarters remain. In 1930, Reemtsma took over the Berlin-based Problem Cigarettes.

In June 1932, Philipp Fürchtegott Reemtsma, head of the company, met with Adolf Hitler, Rudolf Hess, and Max Amann. Reemtsma's ads ran in the publications of other political factions, but had been banned from Nazi party publications. However, the Nazi publications lost money, and the party needed money for election campaigning. Hitler scolded Reemtsma for having Jewish partners and managers, but they agreed to an initial deal on half a million marks of advertising.

During the Third Reich the company prospered despite the official anti-tobacco policy of the Nazis. Shortly after the Nazis took power in 1933, Philipp Reemtsma asked Hermann Göring, then the highest official in Prussia, to do something about a court case and SA attacks against the company. In early 1934, Göring called off the court case in exchange for three million marks; Reemtsma subsequently paid him a million a year, in addition to substantial donations to the party. By July 1934 the Night of the Long Knives had removed the threat of the SA. Reemtsma's Jewish partners, notably David Schnur, emigrated, along with many Jewish employees, with help from Reemtsma.

In 1937, the company merged with "Haus Neuerburg" and reached a 65% market share. Between 1933 and 1939, the firm's profits increased tenfold to 114 million reichsmarks. In 1939, Philipp F. Reemtsma was promoted leader of the Fachuntergruppe Zigarettenindustrie part of the National Socialist economy and recognized by Göring as a Wehrwirtschaftsführer. Cigarettes were distributed free to soldiers, including minors, as part of their pay, and the market continued to grow rapidly.

Forced labour was used by Reemtsma during the war, with prison camps set up at some locations. Reemtsma also used forced labour, including child labour, to harvest tobacco in the Crimea, with the local population being given bread and flour in return for their work.

By 1941, tobacco taxes made up about a twelfth of state income, and antismoking efforts were being discouraged. In 1942 there was a shortage of tobacco, and 2/3 of all German tobacco factories were shut down, some to be converted into armaments factories. Tobacco went on the ration, retarding the rapid rise in consumption. Reemtsma remained profitable.

Reemtsma's financial support of the Nazis was unparalleled among German companies. The Sturmabteilung and other party organizations were given six-figure sums, and the Hitler Youth were given an aircraft. After the war, Philipp Reemtsma was charged with having paid 12.3 million reichsmarks to Göring. No legal conviction was forthcoming, and he was released after twenty months. In 1948 he was considered denazified and continued running the business, reinstating or compensating his partners who had fled.

In 1980, Philipp Reemtsma's only surviving son, coming of age after his death, refused to take over the company and sold his shares. He later privately undertook to compensate surviving Crimeans for their unpaid labour for his father.

The German coffee producing company Tchibo then bought the majority of Reemtsma. The shares were sold in 2002 to Imperial Tobacco; at the time, it was the world's fourth-largest tobacco company. It is now a daughter company of the renamed Imperial Tobacco, Imperial Brands.

Products 
Today, Reemtsma sells cigarettes, loose tobacco, cigarillos as well as other tobacco products. Although predominantly distributed in Germany, some tobacco products are distributed across Europe. Brands such as Gauloises are produced and distributed by Reemtsma in Germany, but by Imperial Tobacco in other territories.

Some of their most famous brands include
 Cabinet
 Davidoff
 Gauloises
 John Player Special (JPS)
 R1
 West

Further reading

References

External links 
 
 Reemtsma during Nazi Germany
 

Manufacturing companies based in Hamburg
Manufacturing companies established in 1910
Imperial Brands
Tobacco companies of Germany
German companies established in 1910